The 2016–17 Russian Premier League was the 25th season of the premier league football competition in Russia since the dissolution of the Soviet Union and the 14th under the current Russian Premier League name. CSKA Moscow came into the season as the defending champions of the 2015-16 season. Fixtures for the 2016–17 season were announced on 20 June 2016.

Teams

As in the previous season, 16 teams played in the 2016–17 season. After the 2015–16 season, FC Kuban Krasnodar, FC Dynamo Moscow and FC Mordovia Saransk were relegated to the 2016–17 Russian National Football League. They were replaced by three clubs from the 2015–16 Russian National Football League, FC Arsenal Tula, FC Orenburg and FC Tom Tomsk.

Stadiums

Personnel and sponsorship

Managerial changes

Tournament format and regulations

Basic
The 16 teams played a round-robin tournament whereby each team plays each one of the other teams twice, once at home and once away. Thus, a total of 240 matches was played, with 30 matches played by each team.

Promotion and relegation
The teams that finish 15th and 16th will be relegated to the FNL, while the top 2 in that league will be promoted to the Premier League for the 2016–17 season.

The 13th and 14th Premier League teams will play the 4th and 3rd FNL teams respectively in two playoff games with the winners securing Premier League spots for the 2017–18 season.

League table

Relegation play-offs
The draw for relegation play-offs scheduling took place on 24 April 2017.

First leg

Second leg

0–0 on aggregate. SKA-Khabarovsk won 5–3 on penalties and were promoted to the 2017–18 Russian Premier League; Orenburg were relegated to the 2017–18 Russian National Football League.

2–2 on aggregate. Arsenal Tula won on away goals and retained their spot in the 2017–18 Russian Premier League; Yenisey Krasnoyarsk remained in the 2017–18 Russian National Football League.

Results

Positions by round
The table lists the positions of teams after each week of matches. In order to preserve chronological evolvements, any postponed matches are not included to the round at which they were originally scheduled, but added to the full round they were played immediately afterwards.

Season statistics

Scoring
 First goal of the season: Ivan Novoseltsev for Rostov against Orenburg (30 July 2016)
 First double: Jano Ananidze for Spartak Moscow against Arsenal Tula (31 July 2016)
 First hat-trick: Pavel Nyakhaychyk for Orenburg against Tom Tomsk (16 October 2016)

Top goalscorers

Last updated: 28 May 2017

Top players by combined goals and assists

Last updated: 6 May 2017

Top assists

Last updated: 6 May 2017

Season events

Transfer bans
On 3 November 2016, FC Tom Tomsk was banned from registering new players for debts to PFC CSKA Moscow for Pyotr Ten's transfer fee. On 27 December 2016, the ban was re-confirmed for debts to a former player Andrei Lyakh. On 19 January 2017, the ban was re-confirmed for debts to player Sergey Kuznetsov and former players Maksim Tishkin, Artyom Yarmolitsky, Aslan Dudiyev, Aleksandr Zhirov, Sergey Samodin, Vitali Dyakov, Anton Kochenkov and Pyotr Ten. On 31 January 2017, the ban was re-confirmed for debts to former players Oleksandr Kasyan and Pavel Golyshev. On 10 February 2017, the ban was re-confirmed for debts to former players Pavel Golyshev and Kirill Pogrebnyak. On 20 February 2017, the ban was re-confirmed for debts to players Aleksei Pugin, Artyom Popov and Kirill Kombarov. By the time the winter player registration window closed on 24 February 2017, the ban remained as place. Most of the players who represented Tom in games played in 2016 left the club as free agents due to non-payment of wages, and as a result, Tom were forced to play out the 2017 games remaining on their schedule with the players registered for their Under-21 squad.

On 16 November 2016, FC Rubin Kazan was banned from registering new players for debts to former player Shota Bibilov. On 23 December 2016, the ban was re-confirmed for debts to player Ruslan Kambolov. On 17 February 2017, the ban was removed.

On 19 December 2016, FC Krylia Sovetov Samara, FC Tom Tomsk, FC Amkar Perm and FC Rubin Kazan were banned from registering new players by the licensing committee of the Russian Football Union for unspecified debts. Krylia Sovetov's ban was removed on 30 January 2017.

Attendances

Awards

Top 33
On 22 May 2017, Russian Football Union named its list of 33 top players:

Other awards announced on the same day included:

Player of the year: Denis Glushakov.

Hope prize (under-21 players): Fyodor Chalov (CSKA).

Coach of the year: Massimo Carrera (Spartak).

Referee of the year: Vladislav Bezborodov.

Team of the year: FC Spartak Moscow.

For contribution to football development: Nikita Simonyan.

References

External links

2016–17 Russian Premier League at Soccerway

Russian Premier League seasons
1
Russian Premier League|Rus